Juliopol  is a village in the administrative district of Gmina Młodzieszyn, within Sochaczew County, Masovian Voivodeship, in east-central Poland.

External links
 Jewish Community in Juliopol on Virtual Shtetl

References

Juliopol